A segmentation gene is a gene involved in the early stages of pattern formation that define repeated units (metameres) in a segmented organism, usually the embryo. They are classified into 3 groups: gap genes, pair-rule genes, and segment polarity genes. The expression of gap genes result in the formation of gaps in the normal pattern of structure in the embryo. Expression of pair-rule genes subdivides the embryo into a series of stripes and sets the boundaries of the parasegments. Segment polarity genes define the anterior and posterior polarities within each embryonic parasegment.

References

Embryology